Değirmençay (formerly Erçel) is a town in Mersin Province, Turkey.

Geography 
The town is in the rural area of Yenişehir district which itself is an intracity district of Mersin. It is situated in the Toros Mountains with an average elevation of  600 m (1830 ft). Its population is 1247

as of 2012.

History 
The village called Erçel may be as old as 300 years. But there are traces of human habitation even before the village was founded. In particular there are ruins of two castles named Manavşa (to the north) and Başnalar (to the south east)    Erçel was an important center of Turkish resistance during the  Franco-Turkish War just after the First World War. In 1961 the village was named as Değirmençay. In 1992 the village was declared a township.

Economy 

Although a mountain town the agricultural products are not different from those produced in the coastal area. Fruits including all kinds of citrus, pomegranate
apricot along with vegetables are produced around Değirmençay . On more barren fields cereal is also produced. Another promising activity is apiculture.

References 

Populated places in Mersin Province
Towns in Turkey